George May may refer to:
George Augustus Chichester May (1815–1892), Irish judge
George May, 1st Baron May (1871–1946), British financial expert and public servant
George A. May (1872–1948), American athletic trainer and administrator
George O. May (1875–1961), American accountant
George S. May (1890–1962), American businessman and golf entrepreneur
George Samuel May (1858–1922), Canadian merchant and politician
George May (footballer, born 1891) (1891–1920), Australian rules footballer for Richmond
George May (footballer, born 1875) (1875–1950), Australian rules footballer for St Kilda

See also
George May Keim (1805–1861), American politician
George May Phelps (1820–1888), American telegraphy inventor
George Maye, MP for Canterbury